Michael McNiven (born July 9, 1997) is a Canadian professional ice hockey goaltender currently playing with the Greenville Swamp Rabbits in the ECHL. He has previously played with the Montreal Canadiens in the National Hockey League (NHL).

Early life 
McNiven was born on July 9, 1997, in Winnipeg, Manitoba. His parents were unable to take care of him, and he was raised by his paternal grandparents, Jim and Christine McNiven. Although he had limited contact with his mother, McNiven's relationship with his father improved throughout his adolescence. He spent the 2012–13 minor ice hockey season as a goaltender for the Halton Hurricanes of the South-Central Triple A Hockey League, where he posted an 11–9 record and 1.48 goals against average (GAA).

Playing career

Junior 
McNiven joined the Georgetown Raiders of the Ontario Junior Hockey League (OJHL) for the 2013–14 season; at 16 years old, he was younger than many other players in the league, who were around the age of 20. McNiven finished the season with a 21–10 record and a .915 save percentage; despite not being expected to make the OJHL playoffs, the Raiders defeated both the Milton Menace and the Buffalo Jr. Sabres before falling to the Toronto Lakeshore Patriots in the West conference finals.

The Owen Sound Attack of the Ontario Hockey League (OHL) selected McNiven in the fourth round of the 2013 OHL Priority Selection, and he signed with the team that year. On February 16, 2017, McNiven stopped all 16 shots he faced for his 10th career junior ice hockey shutout, passing Jordan Binnington for the most in Attack history. That May, he was awarded both the Jim Rutherford Trophy for the best goaltender in the OHL, as well as the CHL Goaltender of the Year award. He finished the season with a 41–9–4 record, 2.30 GAA, .915 save percentage, and six shutouts in 54 games.

Professional 
After going undrafted in the 2015 NHL Entry Draft, the Montreal Canadiens of the National Hockey League (NHL) signed McNiven to a three-year, entry-level contract on September 24, 2015. He made his NHL debut on January 24, 2022, relieving Cayden Primeau in the third period of an 8–2 loss to the Minnesota Wild. Primeau left the game after allowing five goals on 32 shots, while McNiven allowed an additional three on seven shots. On March 2, 2022, McNiven was traded to the Calgary Flames in exchange for future considerations. Before he made an appearance within the Flames organization, McNiven was again traded by the Flames to the Ottawa Senators in exchange for future considerations on March 21, 2022.

As a free agent from the Senators at the conclusion of his contract, McNiven went un-signed over the summer. Approaching the 2022–23 season without an NHL or AHL offer, McNiven was signed to a contract with the Greenville Swamp Rabbits of the ECHL on October 10, 2022.

Career statistics

Awards and honours

References

External links 
 

1997 births
Living people
Adirondack Thunder players
Belleville Senators players
Brampton Beast players
Canadian ice hockey goaltenders
Greenville Swamp Rabbits players
Jacksonville Icemen players
Laval Rocket players
Montreal Canadiens players
Norfolk Admirals (ECHL) players
Owen Sound Attack players
Ice hockey people from Winnipeg
Undrafted National Hockey League players